Corsicana is an unincorporated community in western Barry County, in the U.S. state of Missouri. The community is located along a tributary to Shoal Creek, four miles west-southwest of Purdy.

History
A variant name was Gadfly. A post office called Gadfly was established in 1848, the name was changed to Corsicana in 1869, and the post office closed in 1905. The present name is a transfer from Corsicana, New York.

References

Unincorporated communities in Barry County, Missouri
Unincorporated communities in Missouri